The Santiago International Book Fair (Spanish: Feria Internacional del Libro de Santiago, FILSA) is an annual book fair held in Santiago, Chile, during October–December. It is organised by the Chilean Chamber for Books (Cámara Chilena del Libro).

History

The Santiago Book Fair was created in 1981 as a national event, an initiative of then mayor of Santiago, Carlos Bombal. It was originally held in Parque Forestal, behind the National Museum of Fine Arts; from 1989 it has been held in the Estación Mapocho Cultural Center.

In 1990 the event was expanded to become an international book fair and in 2011, for the first time, it featured a section dedicated to electronic books. That year, a total of 260,000 people visited the book fair, with more than 500 cultural activities, 400 writers and more than 700 publishers represented in more than 10,000 metres squared of exhibits. In 2013, more than 300,000 people visited the fair.

From 1997 until 2012, each year a country was invited as honoured guest, with their literature and authors featured in exhibits. In 2013 and 2014, the fair featured the author as special guest.

From 2003, in the same place where the National Book Fair was held, the Parque Forestal Book Fair is held during January (summertime in Santiago), in the Juan Sebastian Bach plaza/Museo de Arte Contemporáneo. This event is free.

Book fairs by year

References

External links
 

Annual events in Chile
Festivals in Chile
Tourist attractions in Chile
Recurring events established in 1981
Chilean culture
Spring (season) events in Chile
1981 establishments in Chile